Luck (French: La chance) is a 1931 French drama film directed by René Guissart and starring Marie Bell, Marcel André and Françoise Rosay. It is based on a play by Yves Mirande about a woman who loses her fortune gambling at baccarat.

It was made by the French subsidiary of Paramount Pictures at the Joinville Studios in Paris.

Cast
 Marie Bell as Tania Balieff 
 Marcel André as Le docteur Gaston 
 Françoise Rosay as Mme. Mougeot 
 Pierre de Guingand as Curral 
 Fernand Fabre as Le docteur Victor 
 Jeanne Fusier-Gir as La concierge 
 Madeleine Guitty as La cuisinière 
 Palau as Le bijoutier 
 Christian Argentin as Le propriétaire
 Robert Casa as Un chef de réception 
 Léonce Corne as L'huissier 
 Charlotte Martens
 Christiane Delyne
 Magdeleine Bérubet
 Maurice Escande

References

Bibliography 
 Dayna Oscherwitz & MaryEllen Higgins. The A to Z of French Cinema. Scarecrow Press, 2009.

External links 
 

1931 films
French drama films
1931 drama films
1930s French-language films
Films directed by René Guissart
Films shot at Joinville Studios
Paramount Pictures films
French black-and-white films
1930s French films